Ward School may refer to:

Argentina
Ward School (Villa Sarmiento, Argentina), a school in Villa Sarmiento within Buenos Aires

Canada
Mary Ward Catholic Secondary School, Scarborough, Toronto, Ontario, known also as "Ward School"

Lithuania
War School of Kaunas, a military school in Kaunas during 1919-1940

New Zealand
Ward School, New Zealand, in Ward, New Zealand

United States
Ward School (Ward, Colorado), NRHP-listed in Boulder County
Ward School (Hartsville, Tennessee), NRHP-listed in 
Trousdale County

See also
North Ward School (disambiguation), schools in Missouri and Ontario
South Ward School (disambiguation), schools in Florida, Iowa, Pennsylvania
East Ward School, also known as the Teresa Merrill School, St. Johns, Michigan, NRHP-listed
West Ward School (disambiguation), schools in Indiana and Massachusetts
First Ward School, Elkins, Randolph County, West Virginia, NRHP-listed
Second Ward School (disambiguation), schools in New Mexico and Wisconsin
Third Ward School, Sheboygan, Wisconsin, NRHP-listed
Fourth Ward School (disambiguation), schools in Nevada, New York, Texas, West Virginia
Fifth Ward School, Louisville, Kentucky, also known as "Monsarrat School"